Oxidercia is a genus of moths of the family Erebidae. The genus was erected by Jacob Hübner in 1825.

Species
Oxidercia acripennis (Felder & Rogenhofer, 1874) Brazil (Amazonas)
Oxidercia albocostata (Butler, 1879) Brazil (Amazonas)
Oxidercia apicalis (Walker, 1865) Brazil (Rio de Janeiro)
Oxidercia asaphisema Hampson, 1926 Guyana
Oxidercia atripustula (Walker, 1862) Brazil (Amazonas, São Paulo)
Oxidercia carpnophora Hampson, 1926 Brazil (Rio Grande do Sul)
Oxidercia cymatistis Hampson, 1926 Brazil (Para)
Oxidercia denticulosa (Walker, 1865) Brazil (Amazonas)
Oxidercia discophora Hampson, 1926 Panama
Oxidercia dorcanderalis (Walker, 1859) Brazil (Amazonas)
Oxidercia excisa Hampson, 1926 Brazil (Rio de Janeiro)
Oxidercia laloides (Dognin 1897) Ecuador
Oxidercia lepraota Hampson, 1926 Guyana
Oxidercia nigrirena Hampson, 1924 Trinidad
Oxidercia nucleola Hampson, 1926 Guyana
Oxidercia punctularis (Walker, 1865) Brazil (Amazonas)
Oxidercia sciogramma Hampson, 1926 Venezuela
Oxidercia thaumantis Hampson, 1926 Guyana
Oxidercia thermeola Hampson, 1926 Peru
Oxidercia toxea (Stoll, [1781]) Colombia, Suriname, Brazil (Amazonas)

References

Calpinae